Jünger is a surname. Notable people with the surname include:

 Ernst Jünger (1895–1998), German writer
 Friedrich Georg Jünger (1898–1977), German writer, brother of Ernst
 Sabine Jünger (born in 1973), German politician

See also
 Junger (disambiguation)
 Jungers (disambiguation)